Scott Palmer Myren (born September 22, 1964) is an Associate Justice of the South Dakota Supreme Court.

Education 

Myren earned his Bachelor of Science from the University of South Dakota in 1985 and he earned his Juris Doctor from the Rutgers Law School in 1988.

Legal career 

After graduation from law school, Myren began practicing law in Denver, Colorado. In 1990, he returned to South Dakota to serve as the South Dakota Supreme Court's permanent staff attorney.

Judicial career

State judicial career 

Myren began his judicial career as an administrative law judge after being appointed by Governor Walter Dale Miller. From 1999 to 2004 Myrsen served as a Magistrate Judge for the Sixth Judicial Circuit. In 2004, he was appointed as a Circuit Judge for the Fifth Judicial Circuit by Governor Mike Rounds. In 2014 he became the Presiding Judge and served until his appointment to the South Dakota Supreme Court.

South Dakota Supreme Court service 

On October 28, 2020, Governor Kristi Noem announced her appointment of Myren to be a justice of the South Dakota Supreme Court to fill the vacancy left by the retirement of David Gilbertson. He was sworn into office on January 5, 2021.

References

External links 

1964 births
Living people
20th-century American lawyers
21st-century American judges
Colorado lawyers
Justices of the South Dakota Supreme Court
People from Mobridge, South Dakota
Rutgers Law School alumni
South Dakota lawyers
South Dakota state court judges
University of South Dakota alumni